Ernest Tubb was an American singer and songwriter and one of the pioneers of country music.

Studio albums

1940s and 1950s

1960s

1970s

Collaborations

Selected compilations

Singles

1930s and 1940s

1950s

1960s

1970s

Other singles

Collaborations

Guest singles

Christmas singles

Notes

A^ The Legend and the Legacy also peaked at number 2 on the RPM Country Albums chart in Canada.
B^ "Mr. and Mrs. Used to Be" reached number 4 on the RPM Country Tracks in Canada.

Country music discographies
 
Discographies of American artists